Resupinatus is a genus of fungi in the family Tricholomataceae. Species are saprobic, and often found growing on the underside of decaying wood or sides of decaying woody substrates. The generic name is derived from the Latin resupinus (bent backward, inverted).

Description

Species in this genus have small fruiting bodies, typically less than 1.5 cm in diameter. Basidiocarps are pleurotoid or cyphelloid in shape, meaning they have a reduced stem, and a flattened cap that is kidney-shaped or circular when viewed from above. Gills are well-developed and radiate outwards from an off-center point of origin or lacking.

Species list

Resupinatus alboniger – Singer 1978
Resupinatus algidus – M. Lange 1955
Resupinatus applicatus – Gray 1821

 The "smoked oysterling"

 Resupinatus atropellitus – Murrill 1915
 Resupinatus chilensis – Singer 1948
 Resupinatus cinerascens – Grgur. 1997
 Resupinatus conspersus – Thorn, Moncalvo & Redhead 2006
 Resupinatus dealbatus – Singer 1973
 Resupinatus graminum – Singer 1973
Resupinatus huia – Thorn, Moncalvo & Redhead 2006
 Resupinatus hyalinus – Thorn, Moncalvo & Redhead 2006
 Resupinatus incanus – Thorn, Moncalvo & Redhead 2006
Resupinatus kavinii – Pilát 1931
Resupinatus leightonii – P.D. Orton 1960

 Contains bioactive compounds with cytotoxic activity.
Resupinatus merulioides – Redhead & Nagas. 1987
Resupinatus multilamellatus – Corner 1996
Resupinatus omphalioides – Singer 1965
Resupinatus physaroides – Malençon 1975
Resupinatus poriaeformis – Thorn, Moncalvo & Redhead 2006
Resupinatus porosus – Thorn, Moncalvo & Redhead 2006
Resupinatus rubrhacodium – Singer 1952
Resupinatus stictoideus – Nakasone 2008
Resupinatus striatulus – Murrill 1915
Resupinatus subapplicatus – Grgur. 1997
Resupinatus subrhacodium – Singer 1952
Resupinatus subvinaceus – Corner 1996
Resupinatus taxi – Thorn, Moncalvo & Redhead 2006
Resupinatus trichotis – Singer 1961

This species is characterized by thick, rigid hairs at the center of the pileus.
Resupinatus urceolatus – Thorn, Moncalvo & Redhead 2006
Resupinatus vinosolividus – J. A. Cooper 2012
 Resupinatus violaceogriseus - G. Stevenson 1964

See also

List of Tricholomataceae genera

References

External links
Photograph

Tricholomataceae
Agaricales genera